Doctor Who: The Eternity Clock is a 2012 action-adventure video game based upon the BBC television series Doctor Who. It was intended to be the first of a series, but it was announced in 2013 that the sequels have been put on hold.

It was released in digital stores by BBC Worldwide and in physical media in Europe for the PlayStation 3 and PlayStation Vita by Sony Computer Entertainment Europe.

Cast
Matt Smith reprises his role as the Eleventh Doctor. Similarly Alex Kingston returns to her role on the show as River Song.

Gameplay
The plot is promised as allowing the player to take on the role of the Doctor and River Song as they travel across space and time in an effort to save Earth by gathering pieces of the eternity clock, an object that is a record of everything that has or will ever happen in all of existence. Along the way is decision making which leads to "multiple possibilities" and puzzles. Players will encounter Daleks, Cybermen, Silurians, and the Silence. The game had previously been confirmed for release on 30 April 2012, but was later postponed to 23 May 2012.

The game takes place just before the events of "Silence in the Library/Forest of the Dead" in River Song's timeline as indicated by various notes within her diary as well as the use of her title of 'Professor'. For the Doctor the game presumably takes place between "A Good Man Goes To War" and "Let's Kill Hitler" or after the events of "The God Complex". It is sure that the events in the Doctor's timeline are not after series 6 finale because The Silence tell the Doctor that one day he will find his doom, referring to Utah in "The Wedding of River Song".

Reception
According to review aggregating website Metacritic, the PS3 version of the game received an average review score of 39 out of 100, based on 21 reviews.

The game received a 3.5 out of 20 from the Australian game critics Stephanie Bendixsen and Gus Ronald on the Australian Broadcasting Corporation television program Good Game: Spawn Point, later describing what they truly wish a Doctor Who game would be like.

IGN editor Mike Bell gave The Eternity Clock a 5.5 out of 10 stating that "Doctor Who: The Eternity Clock is a game that is filled to the brim with good intentions and does a lot of things right, but that even the Pandorica couldn’t fix the amount of technical issues present."

Developers have responded to some criticisms and released an update. This update addresses bugs, AI issues and adds additional save locations.

References

External links

playstation.com blog
Official press release announcing the game
IGN PS3 version preview

2012 video games
PlayStation 3 games
PlayStation Network games
PlayStation Vita games
Science fiction video games
Video games about time travel
Unreal Engine games
Video games based on Doctor Who
Video games developed in the United Kingdom
Video games featuring female protagonists
Windows games
Multiplayer and single-player video games
Supermassive Games
Video games using cast members from original production